Roadhouse Nights is a 1930 American Pre-Code gangster film.  A number of sources including Sally Cline in her book Dashiell Hammett Man of Mystery claim it is based on the classic novel Red Harvest written by Dashiell Hammett (author of The Maltese Falcon, The Thin Man, and The Glass Key).  However the credits of the film itself say only "An Original Screenplay by Ben Hecht." Hammett receives no mention at all (and the plots are not similar).

The movie, an unusual amalgam of musical comedy and gangster melodrama, was directed by Hobart Henley, stars Helen Morgan,  Charles Ruggles, and Fred Kohler, and features a rare screen musical comedy performance by Jimmy Durante, in his screen debut, with his vaudeville partners Lou Clayton and Eddie Jackson ("Clayton, Jackson, and Durante").  Helen Morgan also sings It Can't Go On Like This.

Production
The film's star is Helen Morgan, a nitery chanteuse whose gangster bosses head a murderous bootleg operation. Charlie Ruggles portrays a news reporter pretending to be an inveterate drinker. He frequents Morgan's club, his phony drunkenness a cover for his investigation of the bootleg ring.

Filmed at Paramount's Astoria Studios in Astoria, Long Island, Roadhouse Nights is typical pre-Code Prohibition-era entertainment, with a reasonably "straight" performance from comic actor Ruggles and a few songs from Helen Morgan.

Cast
Helen Morgan as Lola Fagan
Charles Ruggles as Willie Bindbugel
Fred Kohler as Sam Horner
Jimmy Durante as Daffy
Leo Donnelly as City Editor
Tammany Young as Jerry
Joe King as Hanson
Lou Clayton as Joe
Eddie Jackson as Moe
Fuller Mellish Jr. as Hogan

External links
 
Mystery File review by Walter Albert
New York Times 1930 review

1930 films
American black-and-white films
Paramount Pictures films
Films produced by Walter Wanger
American crime films
1930 crime films
Films based on works by Dashiell Hammett
1930s American films